Bulud Qarachorlu (born 1926 in Maragheh, Eastern Azerbaijan — died 1979 in Tehran), mainly known by his pen name, (Sahand : سهند), was a legendary Iranian poet of the Azerbaijani people. Sahand wrote in the Azerbaijani language.

Work
 Sazimin Sözü
 poem of Araz
 poem of Khatirah

Notes

 Bulud Qaraçurlu Səhənd. "Dədəmin kitabı". Stockholm, 2006.
 Parvana Mammadli. "Azerbaijan matbuat tarixi". Baku, 2010.
 Fikrət Süleymanoğlu. Səhənd: mühiti, həyatı və yaradıcılığı (monoqrafiya). Bakı: Nurlar NPO, – 2017. – 176 s.

External links
 

1926 births
People from Maragheh
1979 deaths
20th-century Iranian poets
Azerbaijani-language poets
20th-century poets